"Covert War" is the eleventh episode of the first season of the period drama television series The Americans. It originally aired on FX in the United States on April 17, 2013.

Plot
FBI agent Frank Gaad (Richard Thomas) announces to his subordinates that three high-ranking KGB officers are being targeted in revenge for the death of agent Amador, including General Zhukov (Olek Krupa), who is murdered shortly thereafter.

KGB agent Elizabeth Jennings (Keri Russell) and her neighbor Sandra Beeman (Susan Misner), the wife of FBI agent Stan (Noah Emmerich), go out dancing. They discuss their love lives, with Sandra confiding about the only other man she slept with besides Stan. Philip (Matthew Rhys) has the children visiting him in the motel room where he stays due to his separation from his wife Elizabeth. Later, Sandra confronts her husband about his whereabouts and tells him that she called the FBI, and they told her he finished work hours ago, which he denies.

Claudia (Margo Martindale) informs Elizabeth of Zhukov's death.  This hurts Elizabeth, who demands that the man responsible — CIA Director of Planning for the Soviet Union Richard Patterson (Paul Fitzgerald) — be killed. Claudia disagrees, telling Elizabeth that those are not her orders, and that she always follows orders, unlike Elizabeth, whom she chastises for having disregarded instructions by letting Gregory commit suicide by cop. In a flashback to 1964, Zhukov and Elizabeth discuss her relationship with Philip.

Elizabeth tells Philip about Zhukov's death, stating that she is going to kill the man responsible, despite orders. Philip tries to talk her out of it, but she finds all the information she can on Patterson — that he is a womanizer and she can seduce him. Meanwhile, Stan is surprised to see his son, Matthew (Daniel Flaherty), return from The Rocky Horror Picture Show wearing makeup. But Matthew reassures him that this doesn't make him gay.

Nina (Annet Mahendru) has been promoted at The Embassy and has received a new office. Arkady (Lev Gorn) tells her about the bug planted in Caspar Weinberger's study. Meanwhile, FBI employee Martha (Alison Wright) has decided to introduce Philip (disguised as FBI counterintelligence agent Clark) to her parents (Richard Kline and Peggy Scott). After an awkward meeting, Philip leaves abruptly but compliments Martha's parents. In another flashback — this time to 1970 in Geneva — Elizabeth confides in Zhukov that she is pregnant with her second child, but has not yet told Philip.

Philip and Elizabeth devise a plan to kidnap Patterson. Elizabeth, in disguise, meets Patterson in a bar, seducing him and bringing him into the bathroom for sex. While they are undressing, Elizabeth tries to inject him with a syringe, but he notices this and fights back. Elizabeth knocks him out in their ensuing fight and she and Philip drag him out of the bathroom window. At their safe house, Nina continues to question Stan about the murder of young KGB official Vlad. But Stan (who shot Vlad) tells her that they may never know who killed him.

In an abandoned warehouse, Elizabeth interrogates Patterson about murdering innocent people. Patterson responds that Zhukov was not innocent. He asks if she loves or cares about anyone, which upsets Elizabeth, who breaks down into tears and leaves the room. Philip comforts her and they decide to let Patterson go. The next day, Stan, Gaad and several FBI agents discuss the kidnapping with Patterson, where he identifies his captors as a couple. In a final flashback to Rome in 1976, Elizabeth tells Zhukov that nothing has changed between her and Philip.

Elizabeth visits Philip in his motel room and thanks him for his support. Philip is packing his clothes, telling her that the kids should not have to visit him in a motel. Elizabeth believes Philip is coming back to their house, which she wants, but he tells her that he plans to rent an apartment. Elizabeth is upset and leaves abruptly. Elizabeth meets Claudia and asks why she told her Patterson's identity, knowing that she'd go after him. Claudia tells her that Zhukov was her lover, but Elizabeth doesn't believe this and thinks that Claudia set her up in an attempt to get her sent back to Moscow. Elizabeth threatens Claudia that "This isn't going to go well for you, old lady."

Production
The episode was written by Joshua Brand and Melissa James Gibson and directed by Nicole Kassell.

Reception
In its original American broadcast on April 17, 2013, "Covert War" was watched by 1.81 million viewers, according to Nielsen ratings.

References

External links
 

The Americans (season 1) episodes
2013 American television episodes